Events from the year 2022 in Michigan.

Office holders

State office holders

 Governor of Michigan: Gretchen Whitmer (Democratic)
 Lieutenant Governor of Michigan: Garlin Gilchrist (Democratic) 
 Michigan Attorney General: Dana Nessel (Democratic)
 Michigan Secretary of State: Jocelyn Benson (Democratic)
 Speaker of the Michigan House of Representatives: Jason Wentworth (Republican)
 Majority Leader of the Michigan Senate: Mike Shirkey (Republican)
 Chief Justice, Michigan Supreme Court: Bridget Mary McCormack

Mayors of major cities

 Mayor of Detroit: Mike Duggan (Democrat)
 Mayor of Grand Rapids: Rosalynn Bliss
 Mayor of Ann Arbor: Christopher Taylor (Democrat)
 Mayor of Lansing: Andy Schor (Democrat)
 Mayor of Flint: Sheldon Neeley

Federal office holders

 U.S. Senator from Michigan: Debbie Stabenow (Democrat)
 U.S. Senator from Michigan: Gary Peters (Democrat) 
 House District 1: Jack Bergman (Republican)
 House District 2: Bill Huizenga (Republican)
 House District 3: Peter Meijer (Republican)
 House District 4: John Moolenaar (Republican)
 House District 5: Dan Kildee (Democrat)
 House District 6: Fred Upton (Republican)
 House District 7: Tim Walberg (Republican)
 House District 8: Elissa Slotkin (Democrat)
 House District 9: Andy Levin (Democrat)
 House District 10: Lisa McClain (Republican)
 House District 11: Haley Stevens (Democrat)
 House District 12: Debbie Dingell (Democrat)
 House District 13: Rashida Tlaib (Democrat)
 House District 14: Brenda Lawrence (Democrat)

Population of largest cities

The state's 15 largest cities, based on U.S. Census estimates for 2021, were as follows:

Sports

Baseball
 2022 Detroit Tigers season – Under manager A. J. Hinch, the team compiled a 66–96 record. The team's statistical leaders included Harold Castro with a .271 batting average and Javier Baez with 17 home runs and 67 RBIs. Alex Lange led the pitching staff with a 7-4  record and Andrew Chafin with a 2.83 earned run average.
 2022 Michigan Wolverines baseball team - In their tenth and final seson under head coach Erik Bakich, the team compiled a 34–28 record and won the Big Ten Baseball Tournament.
 2022 Michigan Wolverines softball team - In their 38th and final season under head coach Carol Hutchins, the team compiles a 38–18 record.
 2022 Central Michigan Chippewas baseball team - Under head coach Jordan Bischel, the team compiled a 43–19 and won the MAC tournament.

American football
 2022 Detroit Lions season - 
 2022 Michigan Panthers season - Led by head coach Jeff Fisher, the Panthers compiled a 2–8 record in the United States Football League (2022).
 2022 Michigan Wolverines football team - 
 2022 Michigan State Spartans football team - 
 2022 Central Michigan Chippewas football team - 
 2022 Eastern Michigan Eagles football team -
 2022 Michigan Tech Huskies football team - 
 2022 Western Michigan Broncos football team -

Basketball
 2021–22 Detroit Pistons season – Under head coach Dwane Casey, the Pistons compiled a 23–59 record. The team's leaders included Saddiq Bey with 1,321 points, Cade Cunningham with 356 assists, and Isaiah Stewart with 617 rebounds. 
 2021–22 Michigan Wolverines men's basketball team – Under head coach Juwan Howard, the Wolverines compiled a 19–15 record and advanced to the Sweet Sixteen at the NCAA tournament.
 2021–22 Michigan State Spartans men's basketball team – Under head coach Tom Izzo, the Spartans compiled a 23–13 record.
 2021–22 Michigan Wolverines women's basketball team – Under head coach Kim Barnes Arico, the Wolverines compiled a 25–7 record.
 2021–22 Michigan State Spartans women's basketball team - Under head coach Tom Izzo, the team compiled a 23–13 record and advanced to the second round of the NCAA tournament
 2021–22 Central Michigan Chippewas men's basketball team
 2021–22 Detroit Mercy Titans men's basketball team
 2021–22 Eastern Michigan Eagles men's basketball team
 2021–22 Ferris State Bulldogs men's basketball team
 2021–22 Michigan Tech Huskies men's basketball team
 2021–22 Oakland Golden Grizzlies men's basketball team
 2021–22 Western Michigan Broncos men's basketball team

Ice hockey
 2021–22 Detroit Red Wings season – Under head coach Jeff Blashill, the Wings compiled a 32–40–10 record. The team's leaders included Dylan Larkin with 31 goals and 69 points scored and Moritz Seider with 43 assists.
 2021–22 Michigan Wolverines men's ice hockey season – Under head coach Mel Pearson, the Wolverines compiled a 31–10–1 record.
 2021–22 Michigan State Spartans men's ice hockey season
 2021–22 Ferris State Bulldogs men's ice hockey season
 2021–22 Lake Superior State Lakers men's ice hockey season
 2021–22 Michigan Tech Huskies men's ice hockey season
 2021–22 Northern Michigan Wildcats men's ice hockey season
 2021–22 Western Michigan Broncos men's ice hockey season

Other
 2022 Detroit City FC season
 2022 Chevrolet Detroit Grand Prix (IMSA)
 2022 Chevrolet Detroit Grand Prix

Chronology of events

January
 January - Omicron variant of the coronavirus surges through Michigan
 January 1 - The 2021 Michigan Wolverines football team lost to eventual national champion in the College Football Playoff
 January 4 - Final U.S. domestic automobile sales data for 2021 showed that Toyota topped General Motors for the first time
 January 11 - Ford Maverick won truck of the year award. Ford Bronco won SUV of the year award. Honda Civic won car of the year award.
 January 11 - Nicklas Lidstrom named vice president of hockey operations for the Detroit Red Wings
 January 14 - The State of Michigan announced  an unprecedented $20 billion surplus resulting from $5.8 billion in anticipated surplus state revenues and $15 billion in unspent federal stimulus and infrastructure funds
 January 15 - University of Michigan president Mark Schlissel fired for cause following an investigation of his relationship with a subordinate.
 January 19 - University of Michigan announced a $490 million settlement with students who asserted they were sexually assaulted by former football team doctor, Robert Anderson
 January 25 - General Motors announced a new $7 billion investment in four Michigan manufacturing facilities, including $4 billion to convert an Orion Township factory for construction of electric pickup trucks and $2.6 billion for a new battery factory in Lansing.
 January 26 -  Gov. Gretchen Whitmer's State of the State address asserted the state had made great progress in 2021 despite the coronavirus

February
 February - Truckers protesting against vaccine mandates on the Canadian side close the Ambassador Bridge, exacerbating supply-chain issues for the automobile industry
 February 1 - Merger launched between Beaumont Health and Spectrum Health
 February 1 - General motors announced distribution of $10,250 profit-sharing checks for workers
 February 3 -  Ford announced $7,377 average  profit-sharing payments  to UAW workers
 February 6 - University of Michigan's offensive coordinator Josh Gattis hired by Miami
 February 13 -  Former Detroit Lions quarterback Matthew Stafford led the Los Angeles Rams to victory in the Super Bowl
 February 16 - Former Macomb County Prosecutor Eric Smith sentenced to 21 months in federal prison in scheme to divert campaign funds from 2012 to 2019.
 February 16 - Jim Harbaugh signed contract extension to remain Michigan's football coach through 2026.
 February 17 - The historic white wooden clubhouse building at Oakland Hills Country Club in Bloomfield Hills was destroyed by fire.
 February 20 - Michigan men's basketball coach Juwan Howard took a swing at a Wisconsin assistant coach after a game in Madison. He was suspended for the balance of the regular season.
 February 27 - Over 1,000 attend a rally in Detroit's Hart Plaza in support of peace for Ukraine following Russian invasion.

March
 March 1 - Oakland County Judge Kwame Rowe ruled that Ethan Crombley should stay in jail through his trial in the Oxford school shooting.
 March 2 - Ford announced division of the company into three automotive business units, including the new Ford Blue (traditional internal combustion vehicles) and Ford Modele (electric vehicles). 
 March 5 - Detroit Pistons drafted Chet Holmgren in NBA draft.
 March - Trial in Grand Rapids of four militia members charged with conspiring to kidnap Gov. Gretchen Whitmer.

April
  April 4 - Killing of Patrick Lyoya
 April 8 - On opening day in Detroit, Javier Baez drove in the winning  run  in the ninth inning to lead the  Detroit Tigers to a 5-4.

May

June

July
 July 29 - Former President Donald Trump endorses Tudor Dixon ahead of the Republican gubernatorial primary election.

August
 August 23  - A federal jury in Grand Rapids found Adam Fox and Barry Croft Jr. guilty of kidnapping conspiracy and conspiracy to possess weapons of mass destruction in the Gretchen Whitmer kidnapping plot.
 August 28 - A shooting spree occurs in Detroit, leaving three people dead and a fourth person injured.

September

October

November
 November 8 - A number of general elections were held, including:
 2022 Michigan gubernatorial election: Incumbent Democratic Governor Gretchen Whitmer defeated Republican nominee Tudor Dixon. Whitmer received 2,427,985	votes (54.5%) to 1,958,311 (43.9%) for Dixon.
 Proposal 3, known as the "Right to Reproductive Freedom Initiative", passed with 2,477,707 votes (56.66%). The proposal added a right of access to abortion to the Constitution of Michigan.
 2022 Michigan Attorney General election - Democratic incumbent Dana Nessel defeated Republican Matthew DePerno. Nessel received 2,320,440 votes (53.2%) to 1,945,531 (44.6%) for DePerno.
 2022 Michigan Secretary of State election - Democratic incumbent Jocelyn Benson defeated Republican Kristina Karamo. Benson received 2,465,218 votes (55.9%) to 1,850,362 (41.9%) for Karamo.
 2022 Michigan Senate election: Democrats won control of the Michigan Senate for the first time since the 1980s, with 20 Democrats and 18 Republicans in the chamber.
 2022 Michigan House of Representatives election: Democrats won control of the Michigan House of Representatives for the first time since 2010.
 November 22 - Kyra Harris Bolden is appointed by Governor Whitmer to the Michigan Supreme Court following Justice Bridget Mary McCormack's resignation, becoming the first Black women to serve on the court.

December

Deaths
 January 19 - Dan Dworsky, UM football player and architect, in Los Angeles
 January 21 - Rex Cawley, Highland Park native and gold medalist in 400 meter hurdles at the 1964 Olympics in Orange, California
 January 21 - Arthur Tarnow, US District Judge in Detroit 1998-2022, in Detroit
 January 30 - Cheslie Kryst, Miss USA 2010 and Jackson, Michigan native, in New York City
 February 4 - Avern Cohn, US District Judge in Detroit 1979-2022, in Royal Oak, Michigan
 February 12 - Frank Beckmann, talk radio host and UM football radio announcer, at Clarkston, Michigan
 February 15 - Woodrow Stanley, mayor of Flint 1991-2002, in Flint
 February 22 - The Amazing Jonathan, Detroit native, and comic magician, in Las Vegas
 March 15 - Eugene Parker, solar and plasma physicist and Houghton native, in Chicago
 April 4 - Joe Messina, Motown guitarist, at Northville, Michigan
 May 8 - Robert J. Vlasic, businessman who grew Vlasic Pickles into America's No. 1 pickle company, in Bloomfield Hills, Michigan
 May 10 - Bob Lanier, Detroit Pistons center 1970-1979, in Phoenix, Arizona
 May 30 - William Lucas, Wayne County Sheriff 1969-1983, in Detroit
 June 22 - Alexander Jefferson, one of the last surviving Tuskegee Airmen, in Detroit
 July 2 - Jim Van Pelt UM quarterback who later starred in Canadian Football League, in Winnetka, Illinois
  July 6 - Norah Vincent, Detroit native, newspaper columnist and author, in Switzerland
 July 11 - Gary Moeller, Michigan head coach 1990-1994, at Lima, Ohio
 August 1 - Robert E. Simanek, received Medal of Honor for actions in Korean War, in Novi, Michigan
 August 8 - Lamont Dozier, Motown singer, songwriter and producer with 14 No 1 hits (Heat Wave, Where Did Our Love Go, Two Hearts), at Scottsdale, Arizona
 August 17 - Jack H. McDonald
 August 19 - John Wockenfuss, played for Detroit Tigers 1974-1983 at Wilmington, Delaware
 August 25 - Mable John, first woman singer signed by Motown, in Los Angeles
 September 3 - Specs Howard, radio disc jockey and founder of broadcasting school
 October 6 - Ivy Jo Hunter
 October 13 -  James McDivitt, Apollo astronaut grew up in Kalamazoo and graduated from University of Michigan
 December 10 - J. J. Barnes, R&B singer/songwriter,

References